Millennium Edition is a Shonen Knife compilation of material from 1996-1999 plus three unreleased versions of songs from Strawberry Sound.

Track listing
"Wild Life"
"Cookie Day"
"E.S.P."
"It's A New Find"
"Fruits & Vegetables"
"People Traps"
"TV Commercial Song"
"One Week"
"Sushi Bar Song"
"Punk Rock Star"
"Banana Chips"
"Mysterious Drugstore"
"Daydream Believer"
"All I Want For Christmas..."

References

2001 compilation albums
Shonen Knife compilation albums